Sir Hugh Dixson (29 January 1841 – 11 May 1926) was an Australian business man and philanthropist.

Biography
Dixson was born in George Street, Sydney, the son of Hugh Dixson and his wife Helen, née Craig. He was educated at the Elfred House Private School kept by William Timothy Cape at Paddington. At 14 years of age, Dixson went to work at a timber yard for Phillip McMahon. In 1856, he joined the tobacco business founded by his father, and became a partner in it in 1864. In 1866, he married Emma Elizabeth (1844–1922), daughter of William Edward Shaw. The business grew steadily and, after his father's death in 1880, expanded rapidly under the management of Hugh Dixson and his brother Robert Dixson. It was subsequently merged in the British-Australasian Tobacco Company Proprietary Limited, probably the largest business of its kind in Australia at the time.

Philanthropy
After retirement, Dixson and his wife continued their interest in the Baptist Church and in various philanthropic institutions. An early substantial gift was £5000 as the beginning of a fund to present a battleship to Britain. This fund was not successful and Dixson's gift was devoted to educating British boys at Australian agricultural colleges. In addition to seeking to fund a battleship for Britain, Dixson supported other patriotic causes.  One such cause was the Legion of Frontiersmen, a patriotic, paramilitary organisation formed in Britain in 1905 by Roger Pocock, a former constable with the North West Mounted Police and Boer War veteran, to bolster the defensive capacity of the British Empire. A gift of £10,000 helped the establishment of an aged and infirm ministers' fund in the Baptist Church, and much assistance was given to the building of churches in various parts of the state. A sum of £20,000 was used to build a cancer wing at the Ryde home for incurables. Dixson, at various times, served as president of the Baptist Union, of the Baptist Home Mission Society, and of YMCA. Dixson was a noted horticulturist, becoming a member of the Linnean Society of New South Wales in 1887, and the Australasian Association for the Advancement of Science in 1898. He was knighted in the 1921 Birthday Honours. Dixson died at Colombo on 11 May 1926, and was survived by two sons, including Sir William Dixson, and four daughters.

In 1900, Emma Dixson founded the Sydney Medical Mission, a service run by women for women of the poorer areas of the city. She was a vice-president of the League of Boy Scouts, and became the patron of the 1st Dulwich Hill Scout Group (known as "Mrs Emma Dixson's Own"), donating the land and paying for the construction of the scout hall. Extensions to the scout hall were built in 1924 by the Dixson children, as a memorial to their mother. In 1919, she gifted six houses in Surry Hills to the Royal Society for the Welfare of Mothers and Babies, to set up a model welfare centre. It was opened in 1922, after Emma Dixson's death, by one of her daughters, and named the Emma Elizabeth Dixson Welfare Centre; the day care centre which was part of it was known in abbreviated form as the Emma Dlxson Day Nursery. She was a life governor of the Queen Victoria Homes for Consumptives, the Crown Street Women's Hospital, Royal Prince Alfred Hospital and of The Infants' Home Child and Family Services; president of the women's branch of the Empire League, and after its reorganisation, a life vice-president of the British Empire League in Australia; the National Council of Women of New South Wales, and the Victoria League; president of the women's auxiliary of the Sydney City Mission; the only female patron of the Veterans' Home of New South Wales; and vice-president of the New South Wales Home for Incurables, Ryde (to which they gave £20,000), and the Fresh Air League.

References

1841 births
1926 deaths
Australian philanthropists
Australian businesspeople
Australian Baptists
YMCA leaders
19th-century Baptists
Australian numismatists